The Art of Biblical Narrative is a 1981 book by Robert Alter in which he outlines a literary approach to the Hebrew Bible. He proposes that "the Bible in its final form constitutes an artistic document with a full texture of interconnected unity."

The Art of Biblical Narrative has been very influential: it "revolutionized the way that scholars read the Bible." Steven P. Weitzman suggests that "By the most conventional measures—number of books sold, favorable reviews, frequency of citation—it is hard to imagine a more successful academic book than Alter's The Art of Biblical Narrative."

The Art of Biblical Narrative won the 1982 National Jewish Book Award for Jewish Thought.

See also 

 Hebrew Bible (Alter)

References

Books about Judaism
Books of literary criticism
1981 non-fiction books
Hebrew Bible studies